Sherri J. Tenpenny is an American anti-vaccination activist and conspiracy theorist who supports the disproven hypothesis that vaccines cause autism. An osteopathic physician, she is the author of four books opposing vaccination. A 2015 lecture tour of Australia was canceled due to a public outcry over her views on vaccination, which oppose established scientific consensus. A 2021 Center for Countering Digital Hate analysis concluded that Tenpenny is among the top twelve people spreading COVID-19 misinformation and pseudoscientific anti-vaccine misinformation on social media platforms. She has falsely asserted that the vaccines magnetize people and connect them with cellphone towers.

Education and career
Tenpenny graduated with a Bachelor of Arts from the University of Toledo in 1980 and received a Doctor of Osteopathic Medicine degree from the Kirksville College of Osteopathic Medicine in Missouri in 1984. From 1986 to 1998, Tenpenny was the director of the emergency department at Blanchard Valley Hospital in Findlay, Ohio. She opened an osteopathic practice in 1994 and went on to establish two more practices in 1996 and 2011.

Anti-vaccination activism
Tenpenny had scheduled a speaking tour in Australia to occur starting in February 2015, but in January, after objections were raised to her anti-vaccination views, all the venues at which she was scheduled to speak cancelled the talks, and the tour was called off. Tenpenny has been criticized by the Stop The Australian Anti-Vaccination Network for "endangering people's health" and "targeting vulnerable parents".

Since 2017, Tenpenny and her business partner, Matthew Hunt, have taught a six-week, $623 course titled "Mastering Vaccine Info Boot Camp" designed to "sow seeds of doubt" regarding public health information. During the course, Tenpenny explains her views on the immune system and vaccines, and Hunt instructs participants on how best to use persuasion tactics in conversation to communicate the information.

Tenpenny promotes anti-vaccination videos sold by Ty and Charlene Bollinger and receives a commission whenever her referrals result in a sale, a practice known as affiliate marketing.

A Facebook page managed by Tenpenny was deactivated in December 2020 as part of the social network's efforts to reduce the amount of misinformation on the platform. Nevertheless, a March 2021 analysis of Twitter and Facebook anti-vaccine content found Tenpenny to be one of 12 individual and organization accounts producing up to 65% of all anti-vaccine content across several social media platforms. Some of Tenpenny's interviews with anti-vaccination activists and conspiracy theorists have attracted a large audience on Rumble, a video-sharing platform that does not have policies against disinformation.

COVID-19 misinformation
Tenpenny advocated against the use of face coverings as a COVID-19 mitigation tool despite scientific evidence in favor of their effectiveness.

In a February 2021 video, Tenpenny claimed that COVID-19 vaccines cause death and autoimmune diseases, saying "Some people are going to die from the vaccine directly, but a large number of people are going to start getting horribly sick and get all kinds of autoimmune diseases, 42 days to maybe a year out." There is no evidence to suggest that COVID-19 vaccines cause autoimmune diseases or death.

In an April 2021 BitChute video, Tenpenny reiterated claims that COVID-19 vaccines lack testing and led to long-term health effects. Neither statement contains scientific merit or accuracy. On May 17, 2021, Reuters issued a fact-check refuting Tenpenny's claim that COVID-19 vaccines affect sperm and fertility. The news organization reiterated that there is no scientific evidence to back these false claims.

Called by Republicans as an expert witness before a June 2021 hearing of the Ohio House Health Committee, Tenpenny promoted the false claim that COVID-19 vaccines cause people to become magnetized such that metal objects stick to their bodies, adding "There’s been people who have long suspected that there’s been some sort of an interface, yet-to-be-defined interface, between what’s being injected in these shots and all of the 5G towers." The video of her testimony was widely circulated, and in early July 2021 Twitter permanently suspended Tenpenny's account for "violating its COVID-19 misinformation policy". Her YouTube account was removed in September 2021 for breaking the company's policies on COVID-19 misinformation.

As Russia invaded Ukraine in 2022, Tenpenny claimed in posts laden with anti-semitic references that this event was manufactured as a distraction to mask new pandemic restrictions. In 2022 she claimed that COVID-19 vaccines will turn people into "transhumanist cyborgs" and that "by the end of 2022, every fully vaccinated person over the age of 30 may have the equivalent of full-blown vaccine-induced immune suppressed AIDS."

A December 2021 de Beaumont Foundation report cited Tenpenny as one of two extreme examples of asmall subset of [...] physicians" making "disproven claims" about COVID vaccines.

Published works
In A Healthier You! published in 2005, Tenpenny described her journey from nurse to physician and the learning process throughout her career, which led her away from conventional medicine and to her adoption of alternative, integrative medicine. In the latter she includes energy medicine that is overlooked by conventional medicine. This she further divides into "chemical energy (ATP) and the mental/emotional energy", and the "life force energy" in the "body's electromagnetic core." The book includes an interview with Deepak Chopra, a pioneer in integrated medicine since the mid-1990s, which informed her approach. Tenpenny also described how British osteopath Robert Boyd, who had developed a Bio Cranial Therapy (BCT), had treated her using BCT, by focusing on her cranial bones. She had begun her  practice as chiropractor twenty years prior to this.  Chopak is one of 18 practioners of alternative medicine that Tenpenny includes in this book, which covers topics such as self-help on weight loss, escaping domestic violence, and back pain.  

In her 2006 book, FOWL! Bird Flu: It's Not What You Think, Tenpenny said there was a common thread and parallels between environmentalists, those who oppose vaccines, stopping war, protecting farm animal rights, compensation for dioxin and Agent Orange poisoning, and the current battlewhich is the objective of this bookto stop the use of genetically modified foods.

In 2006, she also published The Risks, the Benefits, the Choices, a Resource Guide for Parents.

In her 2008 book, Saying No to Vaccines: A Resource Guide for All Ages, Tenpenny linked vaccines to the "skyrocketing autism epidemic" despite the scientific consensus refuting this claim.

References

External links
 Tenpenny IMC website

American osteopathic physicians
Living people
American anti-vaccination activists
University of Toledo alumni
Year of birth missing (living people)
COVID-19 conspiracy theorists
American conspiracy theorists
5G conspiracy theorists
A. T. Still University alumni
Orthomolecular medicine advocates
21st-century American women